James Henry Foley (1 November 1898 – 30 March 1969) was an Irish cricketer. A right-handed batsman, he played just once for the Ireland cricket team, a first-class match against Wales in June 1926.

References

1898 births
1969 deaths
Irish cricketers
Cricketers from County Cork